End of World War II can refer to:

 End of World War II in Europe
 End of World War II in Asia